During the 1915–16 English football season, Brentford competed in the London Combination. In the first season of non-competitive wartime football during the First World War, the Bees finished in mid-table in each of the leagues run by the London Combination.

Season summary

Having ended the 1914–15 Southern League Second Division season £7,000 in debt (equivalent to £ in ), the suspension of competitive football due to the ongoing First World War proved to be a blessing for Brentford, who were given the chance to face Football League clubs Chelsea, Tottenham Hotspur, Arsenal, Clapton Orient and Fulham in the wartime London Combination. Professionalism had also been abolished, meaning that the club needed only to pay its players expenses and in addition, the clubs of the London Combination were predominantly London-based, meaning those expenses would be lower than that of previous seasons. The squad had been decimated by the entry of players into the Army or munitions work, which meant that only goalkeeper Ted Price, full backs Dusty Rhodes and Bertie Rosier, half back Alf Amos and forwards Patsy Hendren and Henry White would play in the majority of Brentford's matches during the season. White would top-score with 13 goals.

Brentford began the London Combination's Principle Tournament strongly, losing just one of the first 10 matches, but the departure of the locally based Football Battalion to the Western Front robbed the club of a source of quality guest players. Local amateurs, guests and soldiers were brought in to plug gaps in the team, though a few guests did make notable contributions during the season – Swindon Town's Bertie Denyer (9 goals in 9 appearances) and Middlesbrough's Dick Wynn (8 goals in 20 appearances). Middlesbrough proved to be a ready source of players, with former Brentford full back Joe Hisbent, half backs Henry Cook, George Malcolm and forward Harry Chapelhow also guesting. Brentford finished the London Combination's two league competitions in mid-table, with the highlights being two West London derby wins versus Queens Park Rangers and wins over Football League clubs Clapton Orient, Arsenal and neighbours Fulham.

Two former Brentford players died during the season:

 Forward John Bayne, an occasional player at the turn of the century, was serving as a private in the Black Watch when he was killed by a rifle grenade at Richebourg-Saint-Vaast on 21 July 1915.
 Former Brentford inside right Alex Walker was serving as a private in the Royal Scots when he died of tuberculosis in Scotland on 12 May 1916.

League tables

London Combination Principle Tournament

London Combination Supplementary Tournament

Results
Brentford's goal tally listed first.

Legend

London Combination Principle Tournament

London Combination Supplementary Tournament 

 Source: 100 Years Of Brentford

Playing squad 
Players' ages are as of the opening day of the 1915–16 season.

 Sources: 100 Years of Brentford, Timeless Bees, Football League Players' Records 1888 to 1939

Coaching staff

Statistics

Appearances and goals

Players listed in italics left the club mid-season.
Source: 100 Years of Brentford

Goalscorers 

Players listed in italics left the club mid-season.
Source: 100 Years of Brentford

Management

Summary

Transfers & loans 
Guest players' arrival and departure dates correspond to their first and last appearances of the season.

References 

Brentford F.C. seasons
Brentford